A lekythion or lecythion, in classical Greek and Latin poetry, is a metric pattern (colon) defined by a sequence of seven alternating long and short syllables at the end of a verse (—u—x—u—). In classical grammatical terminology it can be described as a trochaic dimeter catalectic, i.e. a combination of two groups of two trochees each (—u—x), with the second of these groups lacking its final syllable; or as a trochaic hepthemimer, i.e. a trochaic sequence of seven half-feet. A lekythion can appear in several different metric contexts in different types of poetry, either alone as a verse or as the second of two cola following a caesura. A frequent type of occurrence in Greek drama is in lines of iambic trimeter, the most frequent metre used in spoken dialogue, i.e. lines of the type x—u—x—u—x—u—. These lines may have a metric caesura after the first five syllables, with the remaining line thus resulting in a lekythion group.

In Euripides and Aristophanes 

The term was coined in reference to a passage in the comedy The Frogs by Aristophanes, in which the two poets Aeschylus and Euripides are engaged in a comic debate criticizing each other's works. Aeschylus makes Euripides recite the beginnings of several of his tragic prologues (all in iambic trimeter), each time interrupting him and interjecting the same phrase "... lost his little oil flask", wherever the verse offers an opportunity, which is frequently the case because of Euripides' propensity to use a metric caesura after the first five syllables.

Below, as an example, is one of the original passages of Euripides (from the prologue of Iphigenia in Tauris), followed by the same passage as parodied in The Frogs. In both cases, the metric lēkythion part is highlighted in green; metric foot boundaries are marked with "|" and metric caesuras with "¦".

("Pelops, son of Tantalus, coming to Pisa with swift horses, married Oenomaus' daughter.")

("Pelops, son of Tantalus, coming to Pisa with swift horses" – "lost his little oil flask.")

(The remainder of the Euripidean passages cited in the Frogs are from plays that are otherwise lost, so the original continuation of the lines is unknown.)

In Hephaestion 

As a technical term in metrical analysis, the term "lekythion" is first attested in the 2nd century AD, in the Handbook of Metrics by the  grammarian Hephaestion. Hephaestion also calls the pattern the "Euripideum" ("", "the so-called Euripideum or Lekythion"). While Hephaestion does not explicitly refer to the passage in The Frogs, he cites some other verses from Euripides as an example. Here, the lekythion is found alone as a full line, in a piece of choral lyrics from the tragedy Phoenissae.

("Now furious Ares has come before my walls ...")

Notes

References 

Ancient Greek poetry
Latin poetry
Poetic rhythm